The Alexandre Sènou Adandé Ethnographic Museum is a museum in Porto-Novo, Benin. It was established in 1957 by the Dahomey Institute. It is operated by Alexandre Sènou Adandé, a noted ethnologist, who was chief archivist and librarian at the Institut Fondamental d'Afrique Noire of Dakar from 1948 to 1960.

References

Bibliography 

 Tchibozo, Romuald (2019). « Héritier des traditions de Xogbonou et intellectuel de son temps : une biographie d’Alexandre Sènou Adandé », in BEROSE -  International Encyclopaedia of the Histories of Anthropology, Paris.

External links
Virtualmuseum
BEROSE - International Encyclopaedia of the Histories of Anthropology

Buildings and structures in Porto-Novo
Museums in Benin
Museums established in 1957